Niceforonia babax is a species of frog in the family Strabomantidae found in Colombia and Ecuador. Its natural habitats are subtropical or tropical moist montane forests and heavily degraded former forests. It is threatened by habitat loss.

References

babax
Amphibians of Colombia
Amphibians of Ecuador
Taxonomy articles created by Polbot
Amphibians described in 1989